Three ships of the Royal Navy have been named HMS Sandown.  Sandown is a seaside resort on the Isle of Wight, England.

 , one of 24  paddle wheel minesweepers, and was launched in 1916 and broken up in 1923.
 , a paddle wheel ferry built in 1934 for Southern Railway's Portsmouth—Ryde service but requisitioned by the Royal Navy in 1939 and converted to a minesweeper, and later in 1942 to an anti-aircraft ship. She was converted back to a ferry in 1945 and was scrapped in 1956.

Battle honours
Ships named Sandown have earned the following battle honours:
Dunkirk 1940
Normandy 1944
Al Faw 2003

References

External links
 Navynews - Ships of the Royal Navy
 MOD page on HMS Sandown
 The Ships List

Royal Navy ship names